Anoplodiscidae is a family of flatworms belonging to the order Gyrodactylidea.

Genera:
 Anoplodiscus Sonsino, 1890

References

Platyhelminthes